30 by 30 (or 30x30) is a worldwide initiative for governments to designate 30% of Earth's land and ocean area as protected areas by 2030. The target was proposed by a 2019 article in Science Advances, "A Global Deal for Nature: Guiding principles, milestones, and targets", highlighting the need for expanded nature conservation efforts to mitigate climate change. Launched by the High Ambition Coalition for Nature and People in 2020, more than 50 nations had agreed to the initiative by January 2021, which has increased to more than 100 countries by October 2022, including Australia. 

$5b funding called the “Protecting Our Planet Challenge” was announced for the initiative in September 2021.

In December 2022, 30 by 30 was agreed at the COP15 meeting of the Convention on Biological Diversity, and became a target of the Kunming-Montreal Global Biodiversity Framework. This includes the G7 and European Union.

The initiative has attracted controversy over indigenous rights issues.

Global
30 by 30 is the third of 23 global biodiversity targets for 2030 in the Kunming-Montreal Global Biodiversity Framework, adopted in December 2022:

Ensure and enable that by 2030 at least 30 per cent of terrestrial, inland water, and of coastal and marine areas, especially areas of particular importance for biodiversity and ecosystem functions and services, are effectively conserved and managed through ecologically representative, well-connected and equitably governed systems of protected areas and other effective area-based conservation measures, recognizing indigenous and traditional territories, where applicable, and integrated into wider landscapes, seascapes and the ocean, while ensuring that any sustainable use, where appropriate in such areas, is fully consistent with conservation outcomes, recognizing and respecting the rights of indigenous peoples and local communities, including over their traditional territories.

European Union
The European Commission's Biodiversity strategy for 2030 was proposed on May 20, 2020, as the European Union's contribution to a post-2020 global biodiversity framework. The strategy contains several biodiversity-related commitments and actions to be delivered by 2030, including:
 increasing the European Union's network of terrestrial and marine protected areas, by expanding Natura 2000 areas, and providing strict protection of areas with very high biodiversity and climate value.
 restore more degraded ecosystems and manage them sustainably, by proposing binding nature restoration targets.
 strengthening governance of European Union biodiversity efforts, including expanded funding, improving implementation and tracking, and integrating biodiversity goals into public and business decision-making.

The biodiversity strategy is a core part of the European Green Deal, and also intended to support green recovery from the Covid-19 pandemic.

United States
On January 27, 2021, President Joe Biden issued an executive order on "Tackling the Climate Crisis at Home and Abroad". Among several initiatives to address the climate crisis, the order directed federal departments to issue a report within 90 days "recommending steps that the United States should take, working with State, local, Tribal, and territorial governments, agricultural and forest landowners, fishermen, and other key stakeholders, to achieve the goal of conserving at least 30 percent of our lands and waters by 2030."

On 6 May 2022, the Biden administration issued Conserving and Restoring America the Beautiful, a preliminary report to the National Climate Task Force outlining the proposed principles, measures, and early focus areas for a national "ten-year, locally-led campaign to conserve and restore the lands and waters upon which we all depend". Participating federal agencies included the U.S. Department of Interior, U.S. Department of Agriculture, U.S. Department of Commerce, and Council on Environmental Quality.

The report identified eight principles to guide the effort:
 Pursue a Collaborative and Inclusive Approach to Conservation
 Conserve America’s Lands and Waters for the Benefit of All People
 Support Locally Led and Locally Designed Conservation Efforts
 Honor Tribal Sovereignty and Support the Priorities of Tribal Nations
 Pursue Conservation and Restoration Approaches that Create Jobs and Support Healthy Communities
 Honor Private Property Rights and Support the Voluntary Stewardship Efforts of Private Landowners and Fishers
 Use Science as a Guide
 Build on Existing Tools and Strategies with an Emphasis on Flexibility and Adaptive Approaches

The report outlined six early focus initiatives:
 Create more parks and safe outdoor opportunities in nature-deprived communities
 Support Tribally led conservation and restoration priorities
 Expand collaborative conservation of fish and wildlife habitats and corridors
 Increase access for outdoor recreation
 Incentivize and reward the voluntary conservation efforts of fishers, ranchers, farmers, and forest owners
 Create jobs by investing in restoration and resilience

The report proposed tracking progress through an American Conservation and Stewardship Atlas, an accessible online database and mapping tool which would provide current information on lands and waters conserved and restored, and an annual America the Beautiful public report, which would track fish and wildlife populations, and progress on conservation and restoration efforts across the country.

California
On 7 October 2020, California governor Gavin Newsom issued an executive order declaring it "the goal of the State to conserve at least 30 percent of California’s land and coastal waters by 2030", and directing state agencies to develop and report strategies for achieving the goal by February 1, 2022. The order also established a California Biodiversity Collaborative composed of representatives of government agencies, Native tribes, experts, and other stakeholders.

The official report, Pathways to 30x30 California, was issued by the California Natural Resources Agency on 22 April 2022. The report outlines ten pathways, or strategies, to achieving California's biodiversity and protected area goals by 2030:
 Accelerate Regionally Led Conservation
 Execute Strategic Land Acquisitions
 Increase Voluntary Conservation Easements
 Enhance Conservation of Existing Public Lands and Coastal Waters
 Institutionalize Advance Mitigation
 Expand and Accelerate Environmental Restoration and Stewardship
 Strengthen Coordination Among Governments
 Align Investments to Maximize Conservation Benefits
 Advance and Promote Complementary Conservation Measures
 Evaluate Conservation Outcomes and Adaptively Manage

See also
 Half-Earth
 Kunming-Montreal Global Biodiversity Framework

References

External links 
 America the Beautiful – U.S Department of the Interior
 Biodiversity strategy for 2030 – European Commission
 30x30 News - Campaign for Nature

Protected areas
Convention on Biological Diversity
Nature conservation
Climate change mitigation
Marine protected areas
2030